Yngvar Løchen (31 May 1931 – 28 July 1998) was a Norwegian sociologist.

He took his dr.philos. in 1965 and was hired as associate professor of community medicine at the University of Oslo the same year. In 1971 he was appointed professor in the sociology of medicine at the University of Tromsø. He served as chancellor from 1977 to 1981.

Løchen's 1965 work  (Ideals and Realities in a Psychiatric Hospital) was selected for the Norwegian Sociology Canon in 2009–2011.

Selected bibliography
This is a list of his most notable works:

 (1965)
 (1970)
 (1971)
 (1977)
 (1985)
 (1993)
 (1998)

References

1931 births
1998 deaths
Norwegian sociologists
Academic staff of the University of Oslo
Academic staff of the University of Tromsø
Rectors of the University of Tromsø
20th-century Norwegian writers
Medical sociologists